Valerie Singleton  (born 9 April 1937) is an English television and radio presenter best known as a regular presenter of the popular children's series Blue Peter from 1962 to 1972. She also presented the BBC Radio 4 PM programme for ten years as well as a series of radio and television programmes on financial and business issues including the BBC's Money Programme from 1980 to 1988.

Early life
Valerie Singleton is the daughter of ex-RAF wing commander Dennis Singleton OBE, later an advertising executive with J.W.Thompson and Eileen Singleton LRAM. She studied dancing at the Arts Educational School, London. Age 12 she appeared as a young dancer in Cinderella at the Finsbury Park Empire. And age 16 danced in Aladdin at the Kings Theatre, Edinburgh with Stanley Baxter playing Wishee Washee. 
She was a young singer in the Ovaltineys. She went on to spend two years at the Royal Academy of Dramatic Art, winning a scholarship for her first term and began her career as an actress at the New Theatre in Bromley. For several years Singleton pursued her acting career, including Nest of Robins, a No 1 Tour starring Jessie Mathews and Sonnie Hale. In 1959, she starred in the BBC television sitcom The Adventures of Brigadier Wellington-Bull. She began presenting on BBC Radio in 1963, hosting On the Sunny Side of the Street for the Light Programme. She was also a reporter on BBC2's Time Out in 1964.
She became a top voice over commentator for TV commercials and presented, with Arnold a cartoon character, the Arnold Doodle Show on ITV on Sundays.

Blue Peter
She joined the BBC in 1961 as a Television continuity announcer and on 3 September 1962 joined Blue Peter, where she stayed as regular weekly presenter, until 3 July 1972. In 1971, Singleton accompanied Princess Anne (later the Princess Royal) to Kenya on the Princess's first overseas trip as the newly assigned President of The Save The Children Fund, for the film Blue Peter Royal Safari. In 1998, the two women met to reminisce about the Royal safari for Blue Peters fortieth anniversary programmes. At Christmas 1971 Singleton and the Blue Peter presenting team hosted the annual Disney Time on BBC1.

The documentary Blue Peter Royal Safari led to the spin-off series - Blue Peter Special Assignments, in which Singleton was solo presenter. It was shown at weekends and ran from 1973 to 1981. Initially each edition focused on European capital cities, but later covered islands and the homes of well-known historic figures. After making the last of her 'in studio' appearances on Blue Peter in October 1975  she was featured as part of the end-of-year 'review'. She returned in January 1976 to mark the death of the first Blue Peter cat, Jason. Just a few weeks later, producer Edward Barnes wrote to tell her that as she was no longer associated with the show in any genuine sense, they were replacing her as the presenter of the Special Assignment series. Her fees were reportedly a factor in their decision.

However, the programme continued to repeat items featuring Singleton for many years and she returned for a final series of the Special Assignment spin-off in 1981 reporting on the Yukon and Niagara Rivers. For both the 20th and 25th Anniversary editions of Blue Peter in 1978 and 1983 respectively, Singleton moderated the live link-ups from around the UK to launch the anniversary badge balloon hunts, thus extending her presenting tenure to 21 years. As a guest, she presented the "Outstanding Endeavour" award to its young recipient on the programme's 30th anniversary edition. Richard Marson states in his Blue Peter 50th Anniversary book that "Singleton never really left Blue Peter".

During her time on Blue Peter, Singleton presented another BBC children's show, Val Meets The VIPs, a chat show which ran for three series during 1973–74. Each edition featured an interview with a single public figure to which an audience of children were invited to put across their questions. A guest in March 1973 was the then Secretary of State for Education, Margaret Thatcher, who when asked if she would like to be Prime Minister said that she did not have enough experience, nor would there be a "woman Prime Minister in my lifetime".

Later work

Having co-hosted a special programme about Metrication in July 1973, she joined Nationwide in October 1973 as the show's "Consumer Unit" presenter with Richard Stilgoe, later becoming one of the main hosts of the show. Singleton was the co-anchor of Nationwides royal wedding coverage in November 1973. She left Nationwide in 1978 to present the BBC's late-night news programme Tonight, replacing Sue Lawley. In 1980, she was the presenter of BBC2's series A Kind of Childhood. She made a brief return to Nationwide in the summer of 1983, presenting a series of films looking at people forced to leave their homeland and settle in Britain.

Singleton hosted many other programmes, notably undertaking a ten-year stint on the Monday-to-Friday BBC Radio 4 PM programme beginning in 1982 (having previously presented the station's Midweek with Valerie Singleton) and eight years presenting BBC2's The Money Programme from September 1980 to March 1988. While hosting PM, Singleton admitted she had a difficult relationship with co-presenter Hugh Sykes and threw a cup of water in his face while live on air. For the 1983 UK General Election held on 9 June, Singleton covered the results from two constituencies, Torbay and Truro.  She interviewed the winning candidates, Frederic Bennett (Torbay) and David Penhaligon (Truro), after the results for the BBC's Election results programming.

When she left PM in 1993, she presented a travel programme for ITV and became a regular travel writer for several national publications.  She made a one-off return to PM on 29 February 2016 to co-present a special 'Leap Day' programme, alongside Eddie Mair. In 1994, she was awarded the OBE for her services to children's television.

In the 1990s she presented a popular quiz on Channel 4 – Backdate. In the late 1990s she presented 12 episodes of Playback for the History Channel, a programme that asked well-known figures about events that have influenced the course of their lives. In 2019 she appeared in Can I Improve My Memory? for Channel 4. She was an early enthusiast for and patron of the painter Jack Vettriano. In 2005, the story of Singleton's move from London to Dorset and the sale of the flat she had lived in for more than forty years was reported in The Times. According to the Metro newspaper in 2007, Singleton intended to publish her biography in time for Blue Peters fiftieth anniversary in October 2008. According to the article, the book would reveal "a few things that will shock". The book is yet to be published.

She was the subject of This Is Your Life in 2001 when she was surprised by Michael Aspel. Earlier, in 1974, she had been the featured castaway on Desert Island Discs.

References

External links
 
 Blue Peter biography

Blue Peter presenters
English reporters and correspondents
English television actresses
English television presenters
English radio personalities
Officers of the Order of the British Empire
People from Hitchin
1937 births
Living people
People educated at Tring Park School for the Performing Arts
Alumni of RADA
People educated at the Arts Educational Schools
20th-century English actresses
Actresses from Hertfordshire
People educated at Frensham Heights School